County Road 362 is a  road in the municipality of Kvænangen in Troms og Finnmark county, Norway.

The road branches off from European Route E6 at Undereidet north of the village of Badderen and runs northwest along the coast of the Badderfjord before terminating at Bankenes on the Doarrás peninsula. 

The road is also named Jafet Lindebergs vei (Jafet Lindeberg Road) after Jafet Lindeberg (1874–1962), a gold prospector and co-founder of the city of Nome, Alaska.

References

External links
Statens vegvesen – trafikkmeldinger Fv362 (Traffic Information: County Road 362)

362
Kvænangen